Koninklijke Ahold N.V. was a Dutch multinational retail company based in Zaandam, Netherlands. It merged with Belgium-based Delhaize Group in 2016 to form Ahold Delhaize.

History

Growth in the Netherlands
The company started in 1887, when Albert Heijn, Sr. opened the first Albert Heijn grocery store in Oostzaan, Netherlands. The grocery chain expanded through the first half of the 20th century, and went public in 1948.

Under the leadership of the founder's grandsons, Albert Jr. and Gerrit Jan Heijn, the company continued to make a significant impact on food retail in the Netherlands in the next four decades, pioneering self-service shopping, and the development of private labels and of non-food as a grocery store category. The company also influenced culinary development in the country, popularizing products such as wine, sherry and kiwi fruit, contributing to the introduction of the refrigerator in Dutch households and introducing convenience items, such as ready meals and frozen pizzas, to Dutch consumers.

Albert Heijn became the largest grocery chain in the Netherlands during this time, and expanded into liquor stores and health and beauty care stores in the 1970s. In 1973, the holding company Albert Heijn changed its name to "Ahold", an abbreviation of Albert Heijn Holding".

International expansion
In the mid-1970s, the company began expanding internationally, acquiring companies in Spain and the United States. Under a new leadership team, which for the first time did not include any members of the Heijn family, the company accelerated its growth through acquisitions in the latter half of the 1990s in Latin America, Central Europe, and Asia.

Ahold N.V. received the designation "Royal" from Dutch Queen Beatrix in 1987, awarded to companies that have operated honorably for one hundred years. That same year Gerrit Jan Heijn, Ahold executive and only brother of Albert Heijn, was kidnapped for ransom and murdered.

Accounting crisis
The company's ambitious global expansion was halted by the announcement of accounting irregularities at some of Ahold's subsidiaries in February 2003. The CEO, Cees van der Hoeven, and CFO, Michael Meurs, and a number of senior management resigned as a result, and earnings over 2001 and 2002 had to be restated. The main accounting irregularities occurred at U.S. Foodservice (now US Foods), and, on a smaller scale, Tops Markets, in the United States, where income related to promotional allowances was overstated. In addition, accounting irregularities were found at the company's Argentine subsidiary Disco, and it was determined that the financial results of certain joint ventures had been accounted for improperly.

As a result of the announcements, the company's share price plunged by two-thirds, and its credit rating was reduced to BB+ by Standard & Poor's.

Legal ramifications
The irregularities led to various investigations and criminal charges by both Dutch and U.S. law enforcement authorities against Ahold and several of its former executives.

Dutch law enforcement authorities filed fraud charges against Ahold, which were settled in September 2004, when Ahold paid a fine of approximately €8 million. Ahold's former CEO, CFO, and the former executive in charge of its European activities were charged with fraud by the Dutch authorities. In May 2006, a Dutch appeals court found Ahold's former CEO and CFO guilty of false authentication of documents, and they received suspended prison sentences and unconditional fines.

The United States Securities and Exchange Commission (SEC) announced in October 2004, that it had completed its investigation and reached a final settlement with Ahold.

In January 2006, Ahold announced that it had reached a settlement of US$1.1 billion (€937 million) in a securities class action lawsuit filed against the company in the United States by shareholders and former shareholders. Another class action lawsuit was filed against Ahold's auditors, Deloitte, but this suit was dismissed. The suit was brought up again by shareholders in 2007, and by a different shareholder group in 2012.

The SEC filed fraud charges against four former executives of U.S. Foodservice: the company's former CFO, former chief marketing officer, and two former purchasing executives. The purchasing executives settled the charges. The former chief marketing officer was sentenced to 46 months in prison. The former CFO was sentenced to six months of home detention and three years' probation.

Road to recovery
Anders Moberg became CEO on 5 May 2003. Under his and other new leadership appointed following the crisis, Ahold launched a "Road to Recovery" strategy in late 2003 to restore its financial health, regain credibility, and strengthen its business.

As part of this strategy, Ahold announced it would divest all operations in markets where it could not achieve a sustainable number one or two position within three to five years, and that could not meet defined profitability and return criteria over time. The company divested all its operations in South America and Asia, retaining a core group of profitable companies in Europe and the United States. As part of its Road to Recovery strategy, Ahold strengthened accountability, controls and corporate governance and restored its financial health, regaining investment grade in 2007.

Strategy for profitable growth
In November 2006, Ahold announced the results of a major strategic review of its businesses. As a result of this review, Ahold launched its strategy for profitable growth focused on strengthening its retail competitive position, particularly in the United States. The company focused on building its brands by creating an improved product and service offering, delivered an improved price position and lowered operating costs; and reorganized the company into two continental organizations led by Chief Operating Officers. As part of the strategy, Ahold further focused its portfolio, including the divestment of U.S. Foodservice (completed in July 2007, to CD&R and KKR for US$7.1 billion), Tops (completed in December 2007, for US$310 million to Morgan Stanley Private Equity) and the company's operations in Poland (completed in July 2007, to Carrefour). The company made solid progress in delivering its strategy under the leadership of John Rishton, appointed CEO in November 2007, who had been part of the team that developed the strategy in his previous role as CFO.

In November 2011, under the leadership of Dick Boer, appointed CEO in March 2011, Ahold announced a new phase of its growth strategy, "Reshaping Retail". This strategy has six pillars - three designed to create growth and three to enable this growth. The six pillars are: increasing customer loyalty, broadening our offering, expanding geographic reach, simplicity, responsible retailing, and our people.

Merger with Delhaize Group
On 24 June 2015, Delhaize Group reached an agreement with Ahold to merge, forming a new company, Ahold Delhaize. At completion of the merger, Ahold shareholders will own 61% of the new combined company while Delhaize Group shareholders will hold the remaining 39%. Ahold CEO Dick Boer will become CEO of the merged company, with Frans Muller, CEO of Delhaize to become deputy CEO and chief integration officer.

Assets
A list of assets (formally) owned by Ahold.

Major shareholders in Ahold

Ahold's major shareholders were:
 Stichting Administratiekantoor Preferente Financieringsaandelen Ahold (Capital interest: 20.19%; Voting rights: 6.55%)
 Mondrian Investment Partners Limited (Capital interest: 4.26%; Voting rights: 4.99%)
 ING Groep N.V (Capital interest: 9.26%; Voting rights: 4.92%)
 Blackrock, Inc (Capital interest: 2.99%; Voting rights: 4.46%)
 Deutsche Bank AG (Capital interest: 3.63%; Voting rights: 4.26%)
 DeltaFort Beleggingen B.V. (Capital interest: 11.23%; Voting rights: 3.82%)
 Silchester International Investors LLP (Capital interest: 3.00%; Voting rights: 3.52%)

Key people 
Source:

Frans W. H. Muller (born 1961), chief executive officer since March 2018. 
Jeff Carr (17 September 1961), chief financial officer since November 2011.
Hanneke Faber (19 April 1969), chief commercial officer since September 2013 (until end of 2017).
James McCann (4 October 1969), chief operating officer Ahold USA since February 2013.
Wouter Kolk (26 April 1966) chief operating officer Ahold Netherlands since February 2015.
Jan Ernst de Groot (11 April 1965), chief legal officer since February 2015.
Abbe Luersman (4 December 1967), chief human resources officer.

See also

 European Round Table

References

Sources
Helsingin Sanomat (daily, print version, 15 June 2004)

External links

Ahold Delhaize
Retail companies established in 1887
2016 disestablishments in the Netherlands
Retail companies disestablished in 2016
2016 mergers and acquisitions
Companies based in North Holland
Multinational companies headquartered in the Netherlands
Supermarkets of the Netherlands
Supermarkets of Poland
Dutch brands
Zaanstad
Dutch companies established in 1887